Romagnese is a comune (municipality) in the Province of Pavia in the Italian region Lombardy, located about 70 km south of Milan and about 40 km southeast of Pavia.

Romagnese borders the following municipalities: Alta Val Tidone, Bobbio, Menconico, Varzi, Zavattarello.

Main sights
 Giardino Botanico Alpino di Pietra Corva, a botanical garden

References

Cities and towns in Lombardy